The 2019 European Running Target Championships was the 14th edition of the running target competition, European Running Target Championships, organised for the first time by the European Shooting Confederation (ESC) and not by the International Shooting Sport Federation (ISSF).

Results

Men

Women

Medal table

See also
 List of medalists at the European Shooting Championships
 List of medalists at the European Shotgun Championships

References

External links
 
 Futócéllövő Európa-bajnokság (European Running Target Championships) 

European Shotgun Championships
European Running Target Championships